Franz Reinisch SAC (February 1, 1903 – August 21, 1942) was an Austrian Catholic priest who refused to take the oath of allegiance to Hitler, for which he was executed. He was a member of the Schoenstatt Movement.

Life

Early life
Franz Reinisch was born on 1 February 1903 in Feldkirch, Austria, and baptized the next day. His parents dedicated the baptism to the Blessed Mother. Reinisch grew up with two brothers and two sisters. His father, Councilor Dr. Franz Reinisch, a finance official, moved often while Reinisch was a child. The family of Feldkirch moved to Bolzano, Bruneck and finally to Innsbruck. During his time in Bolzano, Reinisch survived a serious illness.

From the autumn of 1914 Franz Reinisch and his brother visited Andreas Gymnasium of the Franciscans in Tyrol. In 1919, the brothers looked for a flat together in order to be more independent. Reinisch, who later recalled this time fondly, performed well in school.

Studies
Franz Reinisch began to study law on 28 September 1922 at the Leopold-Franzens University in Innsbruck. His motto for this time, derived from the motto of his fraternity K.Ö.HV Leopoldina was "immovable as the mountains of home, our faith is in Jesus Christ and Mary." A year later he studied in the Kiel coroner's office, where he was temporarily a member of the AV-Rheno Guestfalia Kiel. During this time he participated in a four-week retreat. Through his experiences in the port city he decided to become a priest. In Innsbruck he began in the fall of 1923, the study of theology and philosophy. At the age of 22, Reinisch entered the seminary of Brixen. Here he first had contact with the Pallotti-priests and engaged into a close friendship with Pallotti-priest Richard Weickgenannt SAC. Through him he joined the Schoenstatt movement. During Advent, he took part in a pilgrimage to Rome. The highlight of this pilgrimage was a papal audience on Christmas Eve 1926. Two years later, on 29 June 1928, he was ordained a priest in Innsbruck Cathedral. In the same year on November 3, he took up residence in the Pallottiner Monastery Untermerzbach in Bamberg. Here he was confronted with strict house rules. He learned to renounce smoking. Right at the beginning of the study period, Reinisch threw out 150 cigarettes. After just three weeks in the novitiate, he planned to run away. Reinisch tried to escape over the wall of the novitiate one evening. However, when he passed the Lourdes Grotto, he could not go on. He later said that it was as if someone held him. This evening was for him the key event of his education. In Salzburg, he finished his theological studies in the fall of 1932.

Time in Schoenstatt
In 1933 Franz Reinisch went to Augsburg. Here he was responsible for youth work and quickly showed his talent for preaching. Among the young people he found many enthusiastic listeners. Through a priestly magazine he first learned of Schoenstatt. Five years later, in 1938, after several transfers to Konstanz, Hohenrechberg, to the St. Paul Home in Bruchsal, Salzburg and Untermerzbach, he finally came to Schoenstatt. Here Franz Reinisch was entrusted with mission work and men's ministry. He held here especially many retreats and conferences. From Schoenstatt he undertook many tours throughout Germany. He also built a close relationship with Father Joseph Kentenich. Early on he began to confront the emerging ideology of National Socialism.
His troubles with the law began when the Gestapo became aware of his speeches in which he openly addressed the incompatibility of Christianity with the ideas of the Nazi regime. For this reason he received a ban on sermons and speeches on 12 September 1940. He took up work for the church by translating ecclesiastical messages and texts from Italian into German magazines. He defied the ban and continued to attend speeches.

Decision of conscience

On 12 September 1941, Reinisch received the call-up to join the Wehrmacht. By this time he was convinced that Hitler was the personification of the Antichrist, and argued against taking the oath of allegiance to Hitler, even though refusing it would bring severe consequences. Although many tried to convince him otherwise, Father Joseph Kentenich, who by this time was in concentration camp at Dachau, strengthened him in his resolve. He often prayed before the image of Mary at the Shrine of Schoenstatt: "Dear Mother Thrice Admirable, let me live as an ardent Schoenstatt apostle and die!" On Easter Tuesday, 1942 he was ordered into the armed forces. During this time of prayer he resolved not to take the oath of allegiance. In a visit to Innsbruck, he told his parents of his decision.

On 15 April 1942, Reinisch arrived a day later than ordered in the barracks in Bad Kissingen and immediately declared his refusal to swear the oath of allegiance to Hitler. He publicly noted that he would swear allegiance to the German people but not Adolf Hitler. He was arrested and brought before a court martial, charged with undermining military morale. His trial dragged on, so he was brought in May to the Berlin-Tegel prison, where the prison chaplain denied him communion for failing to perform his duty. In August he was moved to Brandenburg in Berlin, where he would be sentenced. In prison he wrote the poem "You're the Great People", as a dirge in anticipation of a death sentence. 

On 20 August 1942, the death sentence was read aloud at 20:00  by the public prosecutor. Reinisch said, "This convict is not a revolutionary; a revolutionary is a head of state or a public enemy who fights with fists and violence. I am a Catholic priest with only the weapons of the Holy Spirit and the Faith; but I know what I am fighting for."  Reinisch prayed that night then wrote a farewell letter to his parents and siblings. His final words from the prison cell were, "Love and suffering into joy, F. Reinisch". On 21 August 1942 he made his final confession at midnight. At 1:00, he received Holy Communion. At 3:00, he gave all he had to his family, including a cloth in which the Eucharist was wrapped, his  crucifix and rosary, some books and his farewell letter. At 3:30 his shoes and socks were taken off, his hands were tied behind his back, and he was led to the basement execution chamber where, at 5:03,  he was beheaded by guillotine. His body was cremated and his ashes buried next to the Original Shrine in Schoenstatt.

Influence 
Father Reinisch's attitude encouraged Franz Jägerstätter in his decision to refuse military service, for which he was executed in 1943.

Honours
On 28 May 2013 the Bishop in Trier, Stephan Ackermann, started the process for beatification for Reinisch. The postulator for this process is Father Heribert SAC.

His feast day is 21 August. Since 1962, in the night of 20 until 21 August is the Reinisch-Vigil of his thought. 

In Schwäbisch Gmünd reminds one at the Cultural Centre "preacher" attached table to the local victims of National Socialism, including Father Reinisch. In the "preacher" and the Gestapo offices were set up from 1938.

In his native town of Feldkirch the Franz Reinisch pathway is named after him, and in Innsbruck/Wilten there is a road sign the Pater-Reinisch-way, dedicated in 1983. In 2001, the municipality Vallendar named the Father Franz Reinisch Bridge after him. In Germany in Friedberg (Bavaria) there is a street named after him, and the Schoenstatt Youth of the Archdiocese of Bamberg gave its house the name Reinisch  .
Memorial Chapel Cathedral Passau

Bad Kissingen has remembered Reinisch since 2001 with a memorial stone. Also in Bad Kissingen, the Father Reinisch House of the Schoenstatt movement is in the diocese of Würzburg, which was named after him in 1979.  The Pallotinerzentrum in Castle Hersberg in Immenstaad has a plaque dedicated to Reinisch.

Father Reinisch is honoured in the Cathedral of Passau in the Memorial Chapel.

References

Literature 
 H. Kreutzberg: Franz Reinisch – ein Märtyrer unserer Zeit. Limburg an der Lahn 1953.
 Klaus Brantzen (Hrsg.): Im Angesicht des Todes. Tagebuch aus dem Gefängnis. Neuwieder, Neuwied 1987.
 Klaus Brantzen (Hrsg.): Märtyrer der Gewissenstreue. Neuwieder, Neuwied 1987.
 Karl von Vogelsang-Institut (Hrsg.): Gelitten für Österreich. Christen und Patrioten in Verfolgung und Widerstand. Norka, Wien 1989, .
 Provinzialat der Süddeutschen Pallottinerprovinz (Hrsg.): Widerstand aus dem Glauben. Dokumentation. Vorträge und Gottesdienst zum 50. Todestag von Pater Franz Reinisch SAC. Hofmann-Dr., Friedberg bei Augsburg 1992.
 Jutta Dirksen: Wagnis Freiheit. Pater Franz Reinisch. Patris, Vallendar-Schönstatt 1993, .
 Klaus Brantzen: Pater Franz Reinisch – sein Lebensbild. Ein Mann steht zu seinem Gewissen. Neuwieder, Neuwied 1993.
 Klaus Brantzen:  Materialien über Franz Reinisch. Forschungsinst. Brenner-Archiv, Innsbruck 1996.
 Wojciech Kordas: Mut zum Widerstand. Die Verweigerung des Fahneneids von P. Franz Reinisch als prophetischer Protest. EOS, St. Ottilien 2002, .
 Heribert Niederschlag: Prophetischer Protest. Der Entscheidungsweg von P. Franz Reinisch. Patris, Vallendar-Schönstatt 2003, .
 
 Christian Feldmann: Einen Eid auf Hitler? Nie! Franz Reinisch: Ein Leben für die Menschenwürde. Patris, Vallendar-Schönstatt 2012, . Pallotti Verlag, Friedberg 2012, 
 Franz-Josef Tremer: „Bei mir beißen die auf Granit" – Der Kriegsdienstverweigerer Franz Reinisch. In: epd. Dokumentation, Frankfurt am Main, 2008 Nr. 2, 53–59, .
 Franz-Josef Tremer: Radikal gelebtes Christentum. Pater Reinisch und seine „politische Inscriptio". In: REGNUM. 34. Jg. H.4. Nov. 2000, 170–178, .
 Franz-Josef Tremer: Brüder im Geiste. Franz der Jägerstätter und Reinisch der Schönstätter. In: REGNUM. 41. Jg. H. 4. Dez. 2007,179–188, .
 Franz-Josef Tremer: „Bei mir beißen die auf Granit". Franz Reinisch – ein „Befreiungstheologe" aus Schönstatt. In: REGNUM. 44. Jg. H. 4. Nov. 2010, 177–187, .

Links 

 
 Schriften von Pater Reinisch aus dem Gefängnis, zusammengestellt für „ERINNERUNGSORTE des NATIONALSOZIALISMUS in Innsbruck und Seefeld"
 Biografie der Schönstatt-Bewegung
 Biografie beim Mahnmal der Opfer des Nationalsozialismus

1903 births
1942 deaths
20th-century Austrian Roman Catholic priests
20th-century Roman Catholic martyrs
Austrian people executed by Nazi Germany
Austrian Servants of God
People executed by Nazi Germany by guillotine
People who were court-martialed
People from Feldkirch, Vorarlberg